Erwan Séguillon (born 1974), better known as R.wan (a derivative of his given name), is a French singer, songwriter and rapper.

Beginnings
R.wan began his musical career in small reggae formations like Sense Lion and Mystik Vibes. In 1998, he met François-Xavier Bossard (known as Fixi), shifting to French chanson, rap and humour. He would eventually lead to the formation of the French band Java.

Java

He was the lyricist, composer and lead singer for the group Java formed in 1997. In 2006 R.wan launched his solo career in addition to his work in Java to who he contributed until 2010. The band also included François-Xavier Bossard (known as Fixi), Jérôme Boivin (known as Pépouseman) and Alexis Bossard (known as Bistrol Banto)

Solo career
In 2006, R.wan launched a solo project with the album Radio Cortex with the drummer Alexis Bossard. The album included 14 songs and 5 jungles in collaboration with Arno Elbaz, K.mille, Climbié, Nicolas Kassilchik, Jérôme Paret, Camille Ballon, Fixi (of Java), Jérôme Van den Hole, and sound engineer Laurent Guénau. The album concept was emulating programming in a pirate radio, thus the jingles. It alternates between reggae, rap, ragga, électro, French chanson and parodies. In November and December 2010, he toured alongside Jamaican Winston McAnuff in collaboration with Fixi. He also appeared with Java, au Zénith of Nancy, and at Élysée Montmartre, Paris. The follow up Radio Cortex 2 in 2008 was produced by K.1000 continuing mixing rap, electro and reggae influences.

His third solo album Peau rouge in 2012, was full of energy and humour but also included a tribute to the Armenian genocide in the track "Le papier d'Arménie". The fourth album Curling in 2017, including "Berbère", telling the story between a Breton and a Berber, with magic use of violin and Mediterranean music.

Soviet Suprem
He also took part in the group Soviet Suprem where he was known as the eccentric "Sylvester Staline". The group takes Soviet-themed songs often mixed with Russian, Balkan, militaro-punk and electronic music.

The collective members are Erwan Séguillon (better known as R.wan from band Java) - known as the character "Sylvester Staline" in the formation and Tom Feterman (from the band La Caravane Passe) known in Soviet Supreme as the character "John Lénine". The band also includes the characters "DJ Croute Chef" and "Yougo Chavez".

Soviet Suprem released the albums L'Internationale in 2014 and Marx Attack in 2018 and the EP Bolchoï in 2014.

Discography

Albums
with Java
2000: Hawaï
2001: Sur Seine (live)
2003: Safari croisière
2009: Maudits français

with Soviet Suprem
2014: L'Internationale
2018: Marx Attack

Solo

EPs
with Soviet Suprem
2014: Bolchoï
2015: L'Internationale (EP bonus)

Singles

References

External links
Official website

French songwriters
Male songwriters
1974 births
Living people
21st-century French singers
21st-century French male singers